Reijo Puiras (2 May 1952 – 4 August 2017) was a Canadian cross-country skier who competed in the 1976 Winter Olympics.

References

External links
 

1952 births
2017 deaths
Canadian male cross-country skiers
Olympic cross-country skiers of Canada
Cross-country skiers at the 1976 Winter Olympics